LDNR may refer to:

 Luhansk People's Republic and Donetsk People's Republic,  two contested regions of Ukraine